Wolf in sheep's clothing is an idiom of biblical origin often wrongly attributed to Aesop

A Wolf in Sheep's Clothing may also refer to:

A Wolf in Sheep's Clothing (Black Sheep album), 1991
A Wolf in Sheep's Clothing (Josephine Foster album), 2005
"A Wolf in Sheep's Clothing" (song), a song by This Providence
"Wolf in Sheep's Clothing", a 2014 song by Set it Off